Iridomyrmex bicknelli is a species of ant belonging to the genus Iridomyrmex. The species is distributed in every single state and territory in Australia. Iridomyrmex bicknelli was described by Emery in 1898.

Subspecies
Iridomyrmex bicknelli formosae Forel, 1912
Iridomyrmex bicknelli luteus Forel, 1915

References

Iridomyrmex
Hymenoptera of Australia
Insects described in 1898